Belwood (Ellen Field) Aerodrome  is located adjacent to Belwood, Ontario, Canada.

See also
Belwood (Baird Field) Aerodrome
Belwood (Wright Field) Aerodrome

References

Registered aerodromes in Ontario
Centre Wellington